Alice Bag is the debut solo album by Alice Bag, released on Don Giovanni Records in 2016. The cover art was created by Martin Sorrondeguy.

Track listing

References

Don Giovanni Records albums
2016 debut albums
Alice Bag albums